Junshan Island is an island in Hunan province in China on Dongting Lake. The name derives from the legend of the Xiang River goddesses. It was formerly a Daoist retreat.

History
Junshan Island consists of 72 peaks on an oval-shaped island in Dongting Lake. It was initially called "Mount Xiang" in ancient times, also referred to as "Mount Dongting".  

Junshan Island is full of historical sites such as the Tomb of Xiangfei. Legend said that 4,000 years ago during Emperor Shun's inspection visit in the south, two concubines named "Ehuang" and "Nüying" followed him to Dongting Lake, but they were stopped by stormy weather. When they heard that Emperor Shun had died suddenly they cried so bitterly that their teardrops turned the bamboo into mottled bamboo. Soon they died of overwhelming sadness and locals built a tomb on Junshan Island to commemorate them.

Attractions
 Feilai Bell 
 Junshan Garden of Love
 Liu Yi Well
 Tomb of Xiangfei 
 Xiangfei Ancestral Temple
 Xiaoyao Palace

Literature
Li Bai, a poet of the Tang dynasty (618–907), wrote: "". Liu Yuxi, another poet of the Tang dynasty, eulogized: "".

Speciality

Junshan Island produces a lot of local specialities among which the most famous is Junshan Silver Needle Tea also known as "Gold Inlaid Jade". The tea was listed as a tribute to the imperial family in the Tang dynasty (618–907). The golden tea leaves narrow and thin as needles, are wrapped by a layer of white filaments. When the tea is being brewed, tea leaves first float up to the top and then sink to the bottom in a vertical position as if they were swords standing upward creating a peculiar phenomenon in the tea cup.

References

Bibliography
 
 

Junshan District
Islands of Hunan
Lake islands of China